, sometimes Saiko, is one of the Fuji Five Lakes and located in the town of Fujikawaguchiko in southern Yamanashi Prefecture near Mount Fuji, Japan.

The remnants of the lava flow are now under the Aokigahara Jukai Forest, and there is evidence to indicate that these three lakes remain connected by underground waterways.

The lake is within the borders of the Fuji-Hakone-Izu National Park.

Saiko has no natural drainage, but an artificial channel now connects it to Lake Kawaguchi.
As with the other Fuji Five Lakes, the area is a popular resort, with many lakeside hotels, windsurfing facilities, camp sites, and excursion boats. Japanese white crucian carp, wakasagi and Kunimasu were introduced to the lake in the Meiji period, and sports fishing is also popular.

However, Kunimasu, which had been introduced to a number of lakes in Japan in the Taishō period were believed to have died out and become extinct, with the last reported sighting in 1935, until rediscovered in Lake Sai in 2010.

West Lake in Hangzhou, China, is written with the same kanji  as Lake Sai.

See also
 Fuji Five Lakes
 Fuji-Hakone-Izu National Park

Notes

References 

Rafferty, John P. Plate Tectonics, Volcanoes, and Earthquakes. Rosen Publishing (2010), 

Saiko
Tourist attractions in Yamanashi Prefecture
Mount Fuji
Landforms of Yamanashi Prefecture
Fujikawaguchiko, Yamanashi